Teucrium pyrenaicum, the Pyrenean germander, is a species of germander native to the Pyrenees. It has gained the Royal Horticultural Society's Award of Garden Merit.

References

pyrenaicum
Flora of France
Flora of Spain
Plants described in 1753
Taxa named by Carl Linnaeus